The Butte Depot is a Northern Pacific Railway train station in Butte, Montana, built in 1906.  It originally served both the Northern Pacific and Union Pacific railroads.  In 1970 the NP merged with the Chicago, Burlington and Quincy Railroad, Great Northern Railway, and Spokane, Portland and Seattle Railway, forming the facility's new owner, the Burlington Northern Railroad; passenger train service was taken over by Amtrak in 1971.  In 1979 Amtrak discontinued the North Coast Hiawatha due to budget cuts, leaving the Empire Builder on the former Great Northern Railway line, as the only passenger rail service through Montana.

See also 
Butte, Montana
Silver Bow County, Montana

References

External links 
Northern Pacific Railway Historic Association
Butte, Montana – TrainWeb

Railway stations in the United States opened in 1906
Railway stations closed in 1979
Former Northern Pacific Railway stations
Former Amtrak stations in Montana
Buildings and structures in Silver Bow County, Montana
1906 establishments in Montana
 National